Thurso and North West Caithness is one of the 21 wards used to elect members of the Highland Council. This was a new ward in the 2017 election following boundary changes. It elects four Councillors.

Councillors

Election Results

2022 Election
2022 Highland Council election

2017 Election
2017 Highland Council election

* = Sitting Councillors for Landward Caithness Ward.
+ = Sitting Councillors for Thurso Ward.

References

Highland council wards
Caithness